Humans Only is the fourth full-length album (1982) by the American electronic band Earthstar.  It was their third and final release for Hamburg-based Sky Records (in Germany).

Humans Only was result of a partnership between Earthstar founder Craig Wuest and Utica, New York-based guitarist and songwriter Dan Hapanowicz (credited as Daniel Happ), who replaced longtime guitarist Dennis Rea on this album. Humans Only presented a far more conventional, softer, more guitar-oriented sound than previous releases.  It is also the last album on which the Birotron, the rarest of tape loop keyboard instruments, was played by Wuest.  The two tracks with "funk" in the title aren't really funk at all, but they do reveal a more playful side to Earthstar's mainly electronic music.

The track "Indian Dances" was originally recorded in 1980, with original drummer/vibraphonist and contributing composer Daniel Zongrone, as part of the Sleeper, the Nightlifer sessions.  That album was never released, and a shorter, somewhat pared-down version was recorded for Humans Only.

Track listing
"Rainbow Dome" – 5:48
"Don't You Ever Wonder?" – 4:50
"Indian Dances" – 8:04
"One Flew Over the Ridge" – 5:28
"TV Funk" – 7:38
"Tip Toe Funk" – 13:20a. "Umbrey Flowing Lights"b. "25 Arrival Pieces"

Personnel
Craig Wuest - Synthesizers, mellotron, Birotron, Celeste, chimes, industrial box, horn keys, percussion, composer, producer, engineer, mixed by
Daniel Happ - Acoustic guitar, electric guitar, bells, chimes, percussion, composer, producer, engineer, mixed by
Andy Retscher - Bass guitar, synth bass, Birotron, engineer, mixed by
Bob Mishalanie - Drum kit
Tim Finnegan - Sounds, wood blocks
Meredith Salisbury - Vocals
Mark Rowe - Sax
Daniel Zongrone - Drums, vibraphone
Melanie Coiro - Bells
Kathy Fusco - Flute
John Leogrande - Congas
Mark Magnet Kimsinger - Rattle, voices
Anne Hacker - Flute
John Bunkfeldt - Engineer, mixed by
Bob Yeager - Engineer, mixed by

In addition, a nine piece string section appeared on the album.

References 
 Discogs Discogs: Earthstar - Humans Only.  Retrieved June 30, 2008. 
 Prog Archives Earthstar - Humans Only.  Retrieved June 30, 2008.  
 Planet Mellotron Earthstar.  Retrieved August 20, 2007.

1982 albums
Earthstar (band) albums